Dimitrovist Pioneer Organization "Septemberists" was a pioneer movement in Bulgaria. The organization was founded in September 1944. DPO "Septemberists" organized children between 9 and 14 years old. Its day-to-day affairs were supervised by the Dimitrov Communist Youth Union. A 1967 estimate put its membership to about 700 000. There were also an organization called chavdarcheta – these were the youngest children, which later became pioneers. The difference between the two was the distinctive scarf, which was sky-blue in the chavdarcheta movement and red in the pioneri movement.

Pledge of the organization 

I, a Dimitrovist Pioneer, today solemnly promise to my comrades and to my heroic people to fight selflessly the work of the Communist Party of Bulgaria, towards the victory of communism. I swear to defend and keep the legacy and promise of Georgy Dimitrov, and to comply with the laws of the Dimitrovist Pioneers. I therefore pledge to be a worthy citizen of my dear fatherland, the People's Republic of Bulgaria.

See also
 Defence Assistance Organisation

References

Pioneer movement
Youth wings of political parties in Bulgaria
Bulgarian Communist Party
Youth organizations established in 1944